was a long-distance runner from Japan, who won the 1956 edition of the Fukuoka Marathon, clocking 2:25:15 on December 9, 1956. He represented his native country at the 1952 Summer Olympics, finishing in 26th place (2:38:11) and won the 1953 Boston Marathon. He retired on July 18, 2009. He was born in Odate, Akita.

International competitions

References

External links
 
 

1927 births
2020 deaths
Sportspeople from Akita Prefecture
Japanese male long-distance runners
Japanese male marathon runners
Olympic male marathon runners
Olympic athletes of Japan
Athletes (track and field) at the 1952 Summer Olympics
Japan Championships in Athletics winners
Boston Marathon male winners